Carlo Alberto Capella is a former Vatican diplomat who was convicted by a Vatican tribunal of possessing and sharing child pornography. He is one of the few people who have served a prison sentence in the Vatican jail.

Monsignor Capella was a career diplomat. Born in Carpi, Italy in July, 1967, he was ordained a priest in 1993. After studies of canon law he entered the Vatican diplomatic corps. He was assigned to the papal nunciature in India in 2003 and to the nunciature in Hong Kong in 2007. In 2008 he was created Chaplain of His Holiness, which entitled  him to the title of Monsignor. In 2011 he was transferred to the Vatican to serve in the Secretariat of State. In 2016 he was assigned to the papal nunciature to the United States.

In 2017, Capella was recalled to the Vatican by Pope Francis after United States officials informed the Vatican that he was under investigation for possession and sharing of child pornography. Shortly thereafter Canada issued a warrant for his arrest, alleging that during a visit to Canada in December, 2016 he had possessed and shared child pornography. As a diplomat, he was immune from prosecution in the United States. In 2018, he was convicted and sentenced to five years in prison, which he is serving in the Vatican jail. As of 2021 he is allowed out during the day to work in an office that sells papal blessings.

References 

Diplomats of the Holy See
Misconduct by Christian clergy
Italian Roman Catholic priests
 Chaplains of His Holiness
1967 births
Living people